Mahant Amar Bharti Ji is an Indian Sadhu who is known for raising his right arm for 48 years and never putting it down for his devotion to Shiva.

Description 
Bharati worked as a clerk in New Delhi until he quit his job and left his family and friends in 1970 in order to develop his devotion to Shiva, one of the principal deities of Hinduism. After quitting his job, he felt like he was still connected to his old life and raised his arm starting in 1973 as a sign of his devotion and "to militate against wars and support world peace". He spent two years of his life in severe pain by doing this, but later lost all sensation in his arm. The muscles in his arm atrophied during this time. Many of his followers have taken inspiration from his actions, calling it a "beacon of hope" and even raising their own arms for years.

References 

Hindu spiritual teachers
Year of birth missing (living people)
Living people